Hakkı Yıldız (born 12 December 1995) is a Turkish-German footballer who plays as a forward for Niğde Anadolu.

References

External links
 Profile at DFB.de
 Profile at TFF.org
 Profile at kicker.de
 

1995 births
Living people
People from Nördlingen
Sportspeople from Swabia (Bavaria)
Footballers from Bavaria
Turkish footballers
Turkey youth international footballers
German footballers
German people of Turkish descent
Association football forwards
FC Erzgebirge Aue players
SpVgg Greuther Fürth II players
Darıca Gençlerbirliği footballers
Ankara Keçiörengücü S.K. footballers
Niğde Anadolu FK footballers
3. Liga players
Regionalliga players
TFF Second League players